Mount Piper Power Station is a coal powered power station with two steam turbines with a combined generating capacity of 1,400 MW of electricity. It is located near Portland, in the Central West of New South Wales, Australia and owned by EnergyAustralia, a subsidiary of CLP Group. On 23 September 2021, it was announced that the closure of the power station is being brought forward from 2042 to 2040 at the latest. The power station employs 250 workers.

Construction
The first generator (Unit 2) was completed in 1992, and the second (Unit 1) in 1993. Units 3 and 4, although planned, were not built. It was the last power station built by the Electricity Commission of New South Wales (a body since abolished). Much of the design work done was undertaken in-house by the commission.

In 2009 Delta Electricity (the government owned enterprise that previously owned and managed the power station as a commercial entity) unofficially re-rated the units at Mount Piper from their original 660MW to 700MW.

In 2007 & early 2008 there was public talk of 'completing' the power station by using modern super-critical, dry-cooling tower, coal-fired units of up to 1000MW capacity which uses much less water from surrounding rivers.

On 7 April 2010 the New South Wales Department of Planning announced that approval had been given to Delta Electricity to 'complete' the station by installing 2000MW of new generating capacity.

Technical
Mount Piper draws its cooling water from Lyell Dam and Thomsons Creek Dam, both purpose-built for the station. Large pumps draw water from the dam and transfer it to a pipeline built between  Thompsons Creek Dam and Mount Piper. The power station taking what water it needs and the excess flowing into Thompsons Creek Dam. When no pumps are in service the water supply to the power station is gravity fed from Thompsons Creek Dam.

Carbon Monitoring for Action estimates this power station emits 9.08 million tonnes of greenhouse gases each year as a result of burning coal. The National Pollutant Inventory provides details of other pollutant emissions, but, as at 23 November 2008, not .

Operations 
The generation table uses eljmkt nemlog to obtain generation values for each year. Records date back to 2011.

See also

 Wallerawang Power Station

References

External links 
 Delta Electricity page on Mount Piper

Coal-fired power stations in New South Wales